Donnell C. Childers (born March 3, 1932) is an American businessman and former politician from the state of Florida. He served in the State Senate from 1975 to 1990.

Biography
Childers was born in 1932 in Alabama. He attended Troy State University where he earned a Bachelor of Science degree, and moved to Florida in 1960. He was a contractor and member of a bank advisory board.

In 1974, he was elected to the State Senate for the 28th district, and he served until 1990.

References

Living people
1932 births
Democratic Party Florida state senators
Troy University alumni
People from Dale County, Alabama
Businesspeople from Florida